Arnaldo Catinari (born 9 January 1964) is an Italian cinematographer and film director.

Career
Born in Bologna, Catinari studied architecture at the University of Florence and in 1983 he enrolled in a course in cinematography at the Centro Sperimentale di Cinematografia under Carlo Di Palma and Giuseppe Lanci. From 1985, he worked extensively as a cinematographer for short films and, since the mid-1990s, for feature films. He has also been active as a director of short films and in 1992 he directed his first and only feature-length film, Dall'altra parte del mondo.

Awards
Catinari won a Nastro d'Argento for best cinematography in 2008 for his work in the films The Demons of St. Petersberg and Parlami d'amore.

References

External links
 

1964 births
Italian cinematographers
Film people from Bologna
Italian film directors
Living people
Centro Sperimentale di Cinematografia alumni
University of Florence alumni
Nastro d'Argento winners